Jamahl Lolesi (born 20 March 1981) is a New Zealand former professional rugby league footballer who played in the 2000s and 2010s.

Background
Lolesi was born in Auckland, New Zealand. He is of Samoan and Irish background.

Playing career
Lolesi made his first grade debut for the Canberra Raiders against Cronulla-Sutherland in round 16 of the 2000 NRL season at Shark Park.

Lolesi played in the club's semi-final defeat by the Sydney Roosters during the same year.  In the 2002 NRL season, Lolesi played in the club's qualifying final defeat by the New Zealand Warriors. In the 2003 NRL season, Lolesi played 25 games and scored 14 tries as Canberra finished fourth on the table.  Lolesi played in Canberra's semi-final loss against the New Zealand Warriors in which they were defeated 17-16 at the Sydney Football Stadium.

Lolesi joined Canterbury-Bankstown for the 2004 NRL season.  He played 20 games and scored 13 tries in the club's premiership winning year but missed out on playing in the 2004 NRL Grand Final due to injury.  As 2004 NRL premiers, Canterbury-Bankstown Bulldogs faced Super League IX champions, Leeds Rhinos in the 2005 World Club Challenge. Lolesi played at centre and scored two tries in the Bulldogs' 32-39 loss. 

Lolesi's first match for the Wests Tigers was the pre-season 2006 World Club Challenge which was lost to the Bradford Bulls in England.  The Wests Tigers would miss out on the finals series in the 2006 NRL season after failing to defend their premiership finishing a disappointing 11th on the table. On 26 May 2009, Lolesi signed a new two-year contract with the Huddersfield Giants. Lolesi retired from playing in 2011.

Coaching career
Before the 2013 Season, Lolesi followed Nathan Brown to St Helens R.F.C. as an Assistant coach where he worked alongside Keiron Cunningham. Jamahl stood in as interim Head Coach, after Cunningham was sacked, and until Justin Holbrook could be appointed.

Career highlights 
Junior Club: Southport Tigers
Career Stats: 131 career games to date scoring 52 tries
Test Stats: 1 test for New Zealand in 2005, scoring 4 points (2 conversions)

References

External links 
Jamahl Lolesi Official Player Profile
Jamahl Lolesi NRL Player Profile

1981 births
Living people
Canberra Raiders players
Canterbury-Bankstown Bulldogs players
Huddersfield Giants players
New Zealand emigrants to Australia
New Zealand national rugby league team players
New Zealand people of Irish descent
New Zealand sportspeople of Samoan descent
New Zealand rugby league coaches
New Zealand rugby league players
People educated at Keebra Park State High School
Rugby league centres
Rugby league five-eighths
Rugby league locks
Rugby league players from Auckland
Rugby league second-rows
Rugby league wingers
Samoa national rugby league team players
St Helens R.F.C. coaches
Wests Tigers players